Dominique Ansel (born 1978) is a French pastry chef and owner of Dominique Ansel Bakery in New York City. He is best known for his invention of the Cronut, a croissant-donut hybrid that became a phenomenon.

Early life 
Raised in a working-class family in Beauvais, a small city north of Paris, Ansel is the youngest of four children. After high school, he apprenticed at local restaurants, first working in savory and then in pastry, gravitating most strongly to the scientific precision of pastry. At age 19, Ansel did his military service in French Guiana as part of a community program teaching locals how to cook.

Career 
Ansel has previously worked at Fauchon and served as executive pastry chef at Daniel, a two Michelin star French restaurant in New York City. He later opened Dominique Ansel Bakery in SoHo, Manhattan. His invention of the Cronut in 2013 became a widely publicized phenomenon, being named one of Time Magazine's best inventions of the year.

He was named Best Pastry Chef in the U.S. by the James Beard Awards in 2014.

The World's 50 Best Restaurants awards named Ansel the World's Best Pastry Chef in 2017, at the age of 39. This made him the first pastry chef in America to be bestowed the honor. Other chefs to have won the award include Jordi Roca, Albert Adria, and Pierre Hermé.  

In January 2021, he opened his first shop in Hong Kong, Dang Wen Li by Dominique Ansel.  

He opened Dominique Ansel Workshop, a croissant shop inside of his pastry kitchens, in New York's Flatiron neighborhood in July 2021.

References

Living people
Pastry chefs
Bakers
French chefs
American chefs
Businesspeople from New York City
French emigrants to the United States
People from Beauvais
1978 births
James Beard Foundation Award winners